The second season of the Mongolian reality talent show The Voice of Mongolia premiered on Mongol TV on January 19, 2020, but the first episode's first half premiered on December 31, 2019 as New Year's Eve gift. The first promo campaign aired on Mongol HDTV and their social media pages during summer.

All four coaches return for their second season. The season had a new "steal" button on the Battles Round, informing each coach had to steal two contestants who just lost at the Battles stage. Then the season expanded from the first season, each coach has ten artists on their team during the Knockouts, rather than eight as in the first season. Meanwhile, Ankhbayar and Uuganbayar returned for their second season as hosts.

Coaches & Hosts 
In October 2019, it was announced that all four of the original coaches returned for this season. Uuganbayar & Ankhbayar, the hosts of the show, also returned. Celebrity guest mentors also worked with coaches during the battle rounds. In Knockout round, Sarantuya, Ganbayar, Enkhmanlai are mentors for TeamOtgoo, Namuun, Naagii are mentors for TeamUka, Camerton is mentor for TeamBold which is his bandmates, Batchuluun is mentor for TeamOnonbat.

Teams

Blind Auditions

Episode 1 (January 19) 
The first Blind Audition taped episode was broadcast on January 19, 2020. But episode 1's first half, first premiered on December 31, 2019. The coaches performed The Beatles song, "Hey Jude" at the start of the show.

Episode 2 (January 26)

Episode 3 (February 2)

The Battles 
After the Blind Auditions, each coach had sixteen or seventeen contestants for the Battle rounds, which aired from March 22 to April 12, 2018. Each episode featured eight battles consisting of pairings from within one team, and each battle concluding with the respective coach eliminating one of the two or three contestants; the eight winners for each coach advanced to the next round. In this season, the new "steal" button introduced, leading each coach had to steal two contestants from the other 3 teams, who just lost their respective battles.

Color key:

Odonchimeg was paired with Badamkhand for the battles, but due to personal reasons, Badamkhand withdrew. Therefore, Odonchimeg performed alone and for the results, she battled with Altanzul and Azbayar, and she lost and left the competition. Meanwhile, Altanzul and Azbayar performed their duet together and both won against Odonchimeg.

Enerelsaikhan and Saruultuya performed their duet together and their coach Bold asked them if they wanted to compete for the show as a band. They both agreed to the offer and continued the show as a band since the battles.

The Knockouts 
After The Battles, the top 40 contestants competed in The Knockouts. In one day, one team's selected 5 contestants (out of 10) competed against each other by singing a song on each of their own. When they all sang their songs, the coach had to choose 1 contestant, and the chosen contestant automatically advanced to The Quarter Finals. After that, the public voted for the remaining 4 contestants and the only one most-voted-contestant continued the show to The Quarter Finals. Each coach had 4 contestants in The Quarter Finals.

Team Otgoo Pt. 1 (April 26)

Team Uka Pt. 1 (May 3)

Team Bold Pt. 1 (May 9) 
Starting with this episode, show will air every weekends, despite being only air on Sunday.

Team Ononbat Pt. 1 (May 10)

Team Otgoo Pt. 2 (May 16)

Team Uka Pt. 2 (May 17)

Team Bold Pt. 2 (May 23)

Team Ononbat Pt. 1 (May 24) 

Aysaule who was stolen from Team Otgoo by Ononbat, but due to personal reasons, Aysaule left the show during the rehearsal of Knockout.

Quarter-finals (Mongolian songs) 
The quarter-finals aired from May 30 to the 31st. Each coach had 4 contestants on their team. In the quarter-finals, the remaining 16 contestants sang only Mongolian songs, respectively. Two teams' contestants performed in one day. After the first team's performances, the public vote remains 4 contestants. The most voted contestant advanced to the next round. After that, the coach had to choose only one contestant, who advanced to the next round.

Color key:

Team Uka & Team Ononbat

Team Otgoo & Team Bold

Semi-finals 
The semi-finals aired on June 7. Each coach had 2 contestants in their team. In this round, the contestants sing only non-Mongolian songs, and one person can vote to only one contestants. After the first team's performances, the public voted for their favorite contestants, and the most voted contestant advanced to the finals. Each coach had 1 contestant in the finals.

Color key

Finals
 Color key

  — Winner
  — Runner-up
  — Third/Fourth place

In the final rounds, (aired June 14 - last day of the season 2) each coach had 1 contestant in his/her team. Oyu from Team Otgoo, Yadam from Team Bold, Dashnyam from Team Uka, Ermuun from Team Ononbat. First, the artists performed in order, then Public's Voting system's 1st round is opening, while the artists performing with their coaches, singing only Mongolian songs. Then the most-voted 2 contestants advanced to the next voting round and singing songs that written for them. After, Public's Voting system's round 2 is opening, Public can vote only remaining 2 contestants.

References

The Voice of Mongolia